Ron Talsky (November 7, 1934 – September 9, 1995) was an American costume designer who worked on both film and TV. He was known for the television show Remington Steele.

He was nominated at the 48th Academy Awards in the category of Best Costumes along with Yvonne Blake for their work on The Four Musketeers.

Selected filmography

The Alamo (1960)
How the West was Won (1962)
The Man Who Shot Liberty Valance (1962)
McLintock! (1963)
The Three Musketeers (1973)
The Four Musketeers (1975)
The Deep (1977)
The Bear (1984)
Bonanza: The Return (1993)
Bonanza: Under Attack (1995)

References

External links

1934 births
1995 deaths
American costume designers
People from Los Angeles